Nisith Ranjan Ray (born 1910–1994) was an Indian historian, social activist and the founder of the Society for Preservation, Calcutta, an organisation working for the preservation of the cultural heritage of Kolkata.

Born in Mymensingh District of the present-day Bangladesh in 1910, Ray taught History at Calcutta University before joining the Victoria Memorial Hall in 1971 as its secretary and curator. He was one of the founder members of the Paschimbanga Bangla Akademi, the apex body for Bengali language in West Bengal and the director of the Institute of Historical Studies, Kolkata. He was the author of several books on history, including Bengal: Yesterday and Today,
Calcutta: the Profile of a City, India and Her People: Bengal, A History of India and Concise history of the Indian National Congress, 1885-1947

The Government of India awarded him its fourth-highest civilian honour, the Padma Shri, in 1992. A year of celebrations for the centenary of his birth was opened in November 2009 by the historians P. T. Nair and Amalendu De.

Selected bibliography

See also 

 Paschimbanga Bangla Akademi

References

External links 
 

Recipients of the Padma Shri in literature & education
1910 births
People from Mymensingh District
Academic staff of the University of Calcutta
20th-century Indian historians
Scholars from Kolkata
Date of death missing
1994 deaths